Marjatta Muttilainen-Olkkonen (born 21 August 1946) is a Finnish cross-country skier. She competed at the 1968 Winter Olympics and the 1972 Winter Olympics.

Cross-country skiing results

Olympic Games

References

External links
 

1946 births
Living people
Finnish female cross-country skiers
Olympic cross-country skiers of Finland
Cross-country skiers at the 1968 Winter Olympics
Cross-country skiers at the 1972 Winter Olympics
People from Virrat
Sportspeople from Pirkanmaa
20th-century Finnish women